The Southwest Bylot plain is an uninhabited plain in Qikiqtaaluk, Nunavut, Canada. It is located in southwestern Bylot Island directly north of Eclipse Sound. Pond Inlet is the closest community. Southwest Bylot is notable for housing the largest known breeding colony of the greater snow goose.

Geography
The plain's habitat is characterized as a rolling outwash with barrens, rocky flats, and tundra. The plain has been dissected by glacial rivers and it slopes towards the mountains.

Flora
Dominant vegetation includes low shrub-herb, and shrub-sedge tundra, along with heath and willow in the river valleys.

Fauna
In addition to the greater snow goose, notable bird species include: black-legged kittiwake, ivory gull, peregrine falcon, Ross's gull, thick-billed murre, colonial waterbirds, and waterfowl.

Conservation
The Southwest Bylot plain is a Canadian Important Bird Area (#NU013). It is one of three IBAs on the island, the others being Cape Graham Moore and Cape Hay. Southwest Bylot is also an International Biological Program site.

References

Plains of Qikiqtaaluk Region
Important Bird Areas of Qikiqtaaluk Region
Important Bird Areas of Arctic islands
Seabird colonies